Cenk Özkacar (born 6 October 2000) is a Turkish professional footballer who plays as a defender for La Liga club Valencia, on loan from Lyon. He also plays for the Turkey national team.

Club career
Born in İzmir, Özkacar spent his youth career at local teams Bucaspor, Altinordu and Altay. He made his professional debut in 2018, while on loan at Karacabey Belediyespor, before returning to Altay the following year.

On 18 August 2020, Özkacar joined Ligue 1 club Lyon on a five-year deal. On 21 April 2021, he made his debut for Lyon as a late substitute for Léo Dubois during a 2–0 loss to Monaco in the Coupe de France. On 6 July 2021, Belgian First Division A team OH Leuven presented Özkacar as new player, on loan from Lyon for one season. In August 2022, Özkacar signed on loan for La Liga side Valencia.

International career
Özkacar has been capped by the Turkey U21s. He had his first cap with the Turkey senior national team on 8 June 2022, getting subbed on in the UEFA Nations League match against Lithuania, replacing Ozan Kabak in the 76th minute. He managed to help his team keeping the clean sheet and ended up winning 6–0.

Career statistics

Club

References

External links
 
 

2000 births
Living people
Footballers from İzmir
Turkish footballers
Association football defenders
TFF First League players
TFF Third League players
Championnat National 2 players
Belgian Pro League players
La Liga players
Bucaspor footballers
Altınordu F.K. players
Altay S.K. footballers
Karacabey Belediyespor footballers
Olympique Lyonnais players
Oud-Heverlee Leuven players
Valencia CF players
Turkish expatriate footballers
Turkey youth international footballers
Turkish expatriate sportspeople in Belgium
Turkish expatriate sportspeople in France
Turkish expatriate sportspeople in Spain
Expatriate footballers in Belgium
Expatriate footballers in France
Expatriate footballers in Spain